This is a list of almond foods and dishes, which use almond as a primary ingredient. The almond is a species of tree native to the Middle East and South Asia. "Almond" is also the name of the edible and widely cultivated seed of this tree. Within the genus Prunus, it is classified with the peach in the subgenus Amygdalus, distinguished from the other subgenera by the corrugated shell (endocarp) surrounding the seed. The fruit of the almond is a drupe, consisting of an outer hull and a hard shell with the seed (which is not a true nut) inside.

"Almonds" may also be from Terminalia catappa, a plant commonly called "India almond."  They are edible, yet not considered as palatable as the "almonds" from Prunus.

Almond foods and dishes

 
 
 
 
 
 
 

 
 
 
 
 
 
 
 
 
 
 
 

 
 
 
 

 
 
 
 
 
 
 
 

 
 
 
 
 
 
 
 
 
 
  - A famous spanish desert in Casinos, Valencia.

Almond cookies

  
 Almond biscuit – also referred to as almond cookie

Beverages
 Almond milk – a plant milk with a watery texture and nutty flavor manufactured from almonds
 Amaretto – an Italian liqueur associated with the city of Saronno
 Amarguinha – a bitter, almond-flavored Portuguese liqueur
 Almond water - A sweet drink with an Almond Scent

Confectionery

See also

 Almond meal
 List of edible seeds
 Lists of prepared foods

References

 
Almond